The 1961 Grand National was the 115th renewal of the Grand National horse race that took place at Aintree near Liverpool, England, on 25 March 1961. 

The winner was 28/1 shot Nicolaus Silver who became the first grey winner for 90 years. He was ridden by jockey Bobby Beasley and trained by Fred Rimell. In second place was last year's winner Merryman II. O'Malley Point finished third, whilst Scottish Flight was fourth. The favourite, Jonjo, finished 7th.

Finishing order

Non-finishers

Media coverage

David Coleman presented Grand National Grandstand on the BBC with commentators, Peter O'Sullevan and Peter Montague-Evans guiding them over the 30 fences. Peter Bromley had now moved over to BBC radio after featuring in the first televised National the year before.

References

 1961
Grand National
Grand National
20th century in Lancashire
Grand National